USS LST-941 was an  in the United States Navy. Like many of her class, she was not named and is properly referred to by her hull designation.

Construction
LST-941 was laid down on 28 July 1944, at Hingham, Massachusetts, by the Bethlehem-Hingham Shipyard; launched on 30 August 1944; sponsored by Mrs. Roland Gariepy; and commissioned on 22 September 1944.

Service history
During World War II LST-941 was assigned to the Asiatic-Pacific theater and participated in the Palawan Island landings in March 1945, the Visayan Island landings in March and April 1945, and the Labuan Island landing, Brunei Bay, in June 1945.

Following the war, she performed occupation duty in the Far East until 25 October 1945. In December 1945, Lieutenant Paul W. Phillips, USNR, took command of the ship. LST-941 returned to the United States and was decommissioned on 1 May 1946, and struck from the Navy list on 3 July, that same year. On 28 March 1947, she was sold to Francis R. Stolz for operation.

Awards
LST-941 earned two battle stars for World War II service.

Notes

Citations

Bibliography 

Online resources

External links
 

 

1944 ships
LST-542-class tank landing ships
Ships built in Hingham, Massachusetts
World War II amphibious warfare vessels of the United States